Song Chanho (born 1959) is a South Korean poet.

Life
Song Chanho was born in Boeun County, North Chungcheong Province, South Korea in 1959. He studied German language and literature at Kyungpook National University. His writing career began in 1987 when several of his poems, including "Geumho River", were published in the literary journal Literature of Our Age. Song published his first poetry collection, The Soil Has the Memory of a Square (1989) two years later.

Song won the thirteenth Dongsuh Literary Award and nineteenth Kim Su-yeong Literary Award, both in 2000. He has also received the Daesan Literary Award (2009) and the Yi Sang Literary Award (2010).

Writing
Song Chanho's style of writing is experimental lyric poetry. His first poetry collection, The Soil Has the Memory of a Square (1989) centred around the image of a square with no exit as a metaphor for life and death. His second poetry collection, The Chair That Remained Empty for Ten Years (1994), similarly focused on contrasting opposites, with more emphasis on the use of language. Song Chanho also frequently uses nature imagery to convey meaning, such as in Red Eyes, Camellia (2000). More recent works, such as The Night of the Cat's Return (2009), have more explicitly criticized society and civilization in general.

Of Song's fifth poetry collection, Pink Wooden Shoes (2016), literary critic Yi Jae-bok wrote that Song's poetry had "a classical elegance as the result of his deep reflection on language and existence." Several of Song's poems and one of his poetry collections have been translated into English.

Works

Works in Korean (partial)
 The Soil Has the Memory of a Square (1989)
 The Chair That Remained Empty for Ten Years (1994)
 Red Eyes, Camellia (2000)
 The Night of the Cat's Return (2009)
 Pink Wooden Shoes (2016)
 Like a Goose Going To Play in the Aster Fields (2016)

Works in translation
 The Night of the Cat's Return
 AZALEA: Journal of Korean Literature and Culture (Volume One)
 Douze poètes coréens contemporains

Awards
 2000: 13th Dongsuh Literary Award
 2000: 19th Kim Su-yeong Literary Award
 2008: 8th Midang Literary Award
 2009: 17th Daesan Literary Award
 2010: 3rd Yi Sang Literary Award

External links 
 소금 창고 “Salt Storage.”
  송찬호 시인이 말하는 나의 시세계 특강 “Poet Song Chanho’s Talk on His Poetry.”

References 

1959 births
Korean writers
Living people
South Korean male poets
Midang Literary Award winners